Atrachea is a genus of moths of the family Noctuidae.

Species
 Atrachea argillacea (Draudt, 1950)
 Atrachea miyakensis Sugi, 1963
 Atrachea nitens (Butler, 1878)
 Atrachea ochrotica (Hampson, 1910)
 Atrachea parvispina (Tschtverikov, 1904)

References
 Atrachea at Markku Savela's Lepidoptera and Some Other Life Forms
 Natural History Museum Lepidoptera genus database

Acronictinae